Niranjan Kumar Mehta is an Indian politician from Bihar and a Member of the Bihar Legislative Assembly. Mehta won the Bihariganj on the Janata Dal ticket in the 2020 Bihar Legislative Assembly election.

References 

Living people
Bihar MLAs 2020–2025
Janata Dal politicians
Year of birth missing (living people)